Ramaz Shengelia Stadium is a multi-use stadium in Kutaisi, Georgia used mostly for football matches. It is the home stadium of FC Torpedo Kutaisi. The stadium is able to hold 12,000 people.

It is named after Ramaz Shengelia, a former Soviet / Georgian football player.

See also 
 Stadiums in Georgia

Sports venues in Georgia (country)
Football venues in Georgia (country)
Buildings and structures in Kutaisi